Calymene Brongniart, 1822, is a genus of trilobites in the order Phacopida, suborder Calymenina, that are found throughout North America, North Africa, and Europe in primarily Silurian outcrops. Calymene is closely related to Flexicalymene, and both genera are frequently found enrolled.
Calymene trilobites are small, typically 2 cm in length. The cephalon is the widest part of the animal and the thorax usually has 13 segments.

The correct genus authorship is Brongniart (1822).  A previously published genus description in Desmarest (1816) (often mis-cited as "Calymena" Desmarest, 1817) was suppressed by ICZN Opinion 1433.

Etymology 
Calymene - meaning beautiful crescent as a reference to the glabella.

Known species and locations 
†Calymene blumenbachii, Dudley, England - Type
†Calymene brevicapitata, N. and S. Wales
†Calymene breviceps, Indiana and Illinois
†Calymene celebra, Illinois, Indiana, and Wisconsin.
†Calymene clavicula, Oklahoma
†Calymene daviesii, Radnorshire, Wales
†Calymene duplicata, Wales and Ireland
†Calymene hopkinsoni, Wales
†Calymene niagarensis, New York
†Calymene parvifrons, Wales
†Calymene senaria, N. Wales and Ireland
†Calymene tristani, Cornwall, England
†Calymene tuberculata, Gotland, Sweden
†Calymene vogdesi, Ohio
†Calymene sp. in the Silurian–Ordovician of Morocco

Reassigned species 
Since the genus  Calymene was established early on in paleontology, a number of species previously assigned to it have since been transferred to other genera:
 C. aculeata = Parasolenopleura aculeata
 C. aequalis = Archegonus aequalis
 C. anchiops = Anchiopella anchiops
 C. arachnoides = Asteropyge arachnoides
 C. arago = Colpocoryphe arago
 C. articulata = Crotalocephalus articulatus
 C. baylei = Metacalymene baylei
 C. bellatula = Cybele bellatula
 C. bufo rana = Phacops rana
 C. calicephala = Orimops calicephala
 C. canaliculata = Solenopleura canaliculata
 C. cambrensis = Flexicalymene cambrensis
 C. caractaci = Flexicalymene caractaci
 C. clavifrons = Cyrtometopus clavifrons
 C. concinna = Proetus concinnus
 C. diademata = Diacalymene diademata
 C. downingiae = Acaste downingiae
 C. frontiloba = Pliomera fischeri
 C. granulata = Phacops granulatus
 C. holometopa = Solenopleura holometopa
 C. marginata = Perliproetus marginata
 C. odini = Chasmops odini
 C. ornata = Ceraurinella ornata
 C. papillata = Papillicalymene papillata
 C. platycephala = Platycoryphe platycephala
 C. polytoma = Pliomera fischeri
 C. sclerops = Pterygometopus sclerops
 C. sinensis = Blackwelderia sinensis
 C. speciosa = Parapilekia speciosa
 C. stenometopa = Acrocephalites stenometopus
 C. stokesii = Phacopidae, generic assignment uncertain
 C. tingi = Calymenesun tingi
 C. tournemini = Placoparia tournemini
 C. tristani = Synhomalonotus tristani
 C. unicornis = Reedocalymene unicornis
 C. variolaris = Balizoma variolaris
 C. verrucosa = Atractopyge verrucosa
 C. volborthi = Ptychometopus volborthi

References

External links

 

Calymenidae
Extinct animals of Europe
Extinct animals of North America
Early Ordovician first appearances
Early Devonian genus extinctions
Phacopida genera
Tremadocian
Floian
Dapingian
Darriwilian
Sandbian
Katian
Hirnantian
Rhuddanian
Aeronian
Telychian
Sheinwoodian
Homerian
Gorstian
Ludfordian
Pridoli life
Lochkovian life
Pragian life
Fossils of Georgia (U.S. state)
Paleozoic life of Ontario
Paleozoic life of the Northwest Territories
Paleozoic life of Nova Scotia
Paleozoic life of Nunavut
Paleozoic life of Quebec